Joseph or Joe Ball may refer to:
 Joseph Ball (Virginia public servant) (1649–1711), English-born justice, vestryman, lieutenant colonel, and Burgess in the Colony of Virginia
 Joseph T. Ball (1804–1861), African-American Latter Day Saint
 Joseph Lancaster Ball (1852–1933), English architect
 Joseph Henry Ball (1861–1931), British architect
 Sir Joseph Ball (British public servant) (1885–1961), British intelligence officer, administrator, barrister, and industrialist
 Joseph A. Ball (inventor) (1894–1951), American inventor, physicist and executive at Technicolor
 Joe Ball (1896–1938), American serial killer
 Joseph H. Ball (1905–1993), American journalist, U.S. Senator from Minnesota, and businessman
 Joe Ball (rugby league) (1927–1964), English rugby league footballer
 Joe Ball (footballer) (1931–1974), English football winger
 Joseph A. Ball (mathematician) (born 1947), American mathematician